Jim Powell is an American radio and television sportscaster, currently employed with Major League Baseball's Atlanta Braves after 13 seasons (1996–2008) with the Milwaukee Brewers.

A native of Roswell, Georgia, Powell was educated at the University of Georgia. He began his baseball play-by-play career with the minor-league Columbia Mets (1987–89, 1993–94) and Charlotte Knights (1990–91, 1995), also calling games part-time for the Minnesota Twins in 1993-94 before being hired by the Brewers in 1996. Teaming with Bob Uecker, Powell called games for the Milwaukee Brewers Radio Network and was named Wisconsin Sportscaster of the Year in 1998. In 2009, he began teaming with Don Sutton to call games on the Atlanta Braves Radio Network. Following Sutton's death prior to the 2021 season, the Braves named Ben Ingram and Joe Simpson as the primary radio team, with Powell continuing to call games on a part-time basis.

In addition to his baseball work, Powell has called college football (for the University of Georgia, University of South Carolina, and CBS Radio) and college basketball (for Davidson College and South Carolina) at various points in his career. He was inducted into the Georgia Association of Broadcasters Hall of Fame in 2020.

References

Year of birth missing (living people)
Living people
American sports announcers
Atlanta Braves announcers
College basketball announcers in the United States
College football announcers
Georgia Bulldogs football announcers
Major League Baseball broadcasters
Milwaukee Brewers announcers
Minnesota Twins announcers
Minor League Baseball broadcasters
People from Roswell, Georgia
Radio personalities from Atlanta
South Carolina Gamecocks football
University of Georgia alumni